Lyconus brachycolus is a species of hake fish in the family Merlucciidae.

Description

Lyconus brachycolus is silvery in colour, with a black median line. The specific name brachycolus means "short colon."

Habitat

References

Merlucciidae
Fish of the Atlantic Ocean
Fish described in 1906
Taxa named by Ernest William Lyons Holt
Taxa named by Lucius Widdrington Byrne